The 2011 season was Negeri Sembilan's 6th season in Malaysia Super League since it was first introduced in 2004, the top flight of Malaysian football.

Negeri Sembilan played in the Malaysian Super League and the Malaysian FA Cup. Negeri Sembilan qualified for the Malaysia Cup, after finishing 6th in the Super League, Negeri qualified to Malaysia FA Cup Final for the second time  with their coach Wan Jamak Wan Hassan. They won the trophy after defeating Kedah FA. The first goal was scored by Baddrol Bakhtiar for Kedah FA in the 27th minutes . Mohd Shaffik Abdul Rahman equalised the score in the 39st minute. Negeri won on a penalty shoot out. Negeri ended their Malaysia Cup campaign at the final, defeated by Kelantan FA.

Club

Coaching Staff

Kit Manufacturers & Financial Sponsor

Player Information

Full Squad

Transfers

In

Out

Loan For Malaysia Cup

Non-competitive

Pre-season

Friendly Match

Competitions

Malaysia Super League

League table

Matches

Malaysia FA Cup

Knockout stage

Malaysia Cup

Group stage

Quarter-finals

Negeri Sembilan FA won 3-1 on aggregate after extra time and advanced to the Semi-finals.

Semi-finals

Negeri Sembilan FA won 6–3 on aggregate and advanced to the Final.

Final

Season statistics

Top scorers

References 

Negeri Sembilan FA seasons
Negeri Sembilan